was a Japanese army officer. As a general in the Imperial Japanese Army during World War II, he was instrumental in the Japanese invasion of Manchuria.

As a leading intelligence officer, he played a key role to the Japanese machinations that led to the occupation of large parts of China, the destabilization of the country, and the disintegration of the traditional structure of Chinese society to diminish reaction to the Japanese plans by using highly-unconventional methods. He became the mastermind of the Manchurian drug trade and the real boss and sponsor behind every kind of gang and underworld activity in China.

After the end of World War II, he was prosecuted for war crimes in the International Military Tribunal for the Far East. He was found guilty, sentenced to death, and hanged in December 1948.

Early life and career

Kenji Doihara was born in Okayama City, Okayama Prefecture. He attended military preparatory schools as a youth, and graduated from the 16th class of the Imperial Japanese Army Academy in 1904. He was assigned to various infantry regiments as a junior officer, and returned to school to graduate from the 24th class of the Army Staff College in 1912.

Doihara longed for a high-ranking military career, but his family's low social status stood in the way. He therefore contrived to use his 15-year-old sister as a concubine for a prince, who in exchange, rewarded him with a military rank and a posting to the Japanese embassy in Beijing as assistant to the military attaché General Hideki Tōjō. After that, Doihara quickly rose within the ranks of the army. He spent most of his early career in various postings in northern China, except for a brief tour in 1921-1922 as part of the Japanese forces in eastern Russia during the Siberian Intervention. He was attached to IJA 2nd Infantry Regiment from 1926 to 1927 and IJA 3rd Infantry Regiment in 1927. In 1927, he was part of an official tour to China and then attached to IJA 1st Division from 1927 to 1928.

He learned to speak fluent Mandarin Chinese and other Chinese dialects, and with this, he managed to take a position in military intelligence. From that post in 1928, it was he who masterminded the assassination of Zhang Zuolin, the Chinese warlord who controlled Manchuria, devising a scheme to detonate Zuolin's train as it traveled from Beijing to Shenyang. After that he was made military adviser to the Kuomintang Government until 1929. In 1930, he was promoted to colonel and commanded IJA 30th Infantry Regiment.

Member of the "Eleven Reliable" clique

Doihara's performance was recognized, and by 1930 he was assigned to the Imperial Japanese Army General Staff Office. There, together with Hideki Tojo, Seishirō Itagaki, Daisaku Komoto, Yoshio Kudo, Masakasu Matsumara and others, he became a chosen member of the "Eleven Reliable" circle of officers. The Eleven Reliable clique was an external tool of a more closed group of three influential senior military officers called the "Three Crows" (Tetsuzan Nagata, Yasuji Okamura and Toshishiro Obata) who wanted to modernize the Japanese military and to purge it of its anachronistic samurai tradition and the dominant allied clans of Chōshū and Satsuma  that favored that tradition. The real sponsor behind both two bodies was Field Marshal Royal Prince Naruhiko Higashikuni, uncle and advisor of the Emperor Hirohito, and responsible for eight fake coups d'état, four assassinations, two religious hoaxes, and countless threats of murder and blackmail between 1930 and 1936 in his effort to neutralize the Japanese moderates, who opposed war, by spreading terror.  Higashikuni highly favored covered work by faithful officers inside the intelligence departments in order to bring about the political program of his own clique named Tōseiha. This clique had a decisive materialistic, westernizing approach on the issue of the Empire's expansion, in a rather colonization-like fashion, as opposed to the rival Kōdōha clique which was for a more "spiritual" way of expansion as an effort to liberate and unite all Asian peoples under a racial, not nationalistic Empire. Kōdōha, headed by Gen. Sadao Araki, under the national socialistic, totalitarian and populistic philosophical influence of Ikki Kita charged Tōseiha for collusion with the Zaibatsu financial conglomerate business clique, or to simply put it, for amoralism and pro-capitalism. It is not quite clear whether Doihara joined the movement for ideological or opportunistic reasons, but in any case, from then on his military career accelerated. In 1931, he became head of the military espionage operations of the Japanese Army of Manchuria in Tientsin. The following year, he was transferred to Shenyang as head of the Houten Special Agency, the military intelligence service of the Japanese Kwantung Army.

"Lawrence of Manchuria”

While at Tientsin, Doihara, together with Seishirō Itagaki engineered the infamous Mukden Incident by ordering Lieutenant Suemori Komoto to place and fire a bomb near the tracks at the time when a Japanese train passed through. In the event, the bomb was so unexpectedly weak and the damage of the tracks so negligible that the train passed undamaged, but the Imperial Japanese Government still blamed the Chinese military for an unprovoked attack, invaded and occupied Manchuria. During the invasion, Doihara facilitated the tactical cooperation between the Northeastern Army Generals Xi Qia in Kirin, Zhang Jinghui in Harbin and Zhang Haipeng at Taonan in the northwest of Liaoning province.

Next, Doihara took the task to return former Qing dynasty Emperor Pu Yi to Manchuria as to give legitimacy to the puppet regime. The plan was to pretend that Pu Yi had returned to resume his throne due to imaginary popular demand of the people of Manchuria and that although Japan had nothing to do with his return, it could do nothing to oppose the will of the people. To carry out the plan, it was necessary to land Pu Yi at Yingkou before that port froze; therefore, he had to arrive there before 16 November 1931. With the help of the legendary spy Kawashima Yoshiko, a woman well-acquainted with the Emperor, who regarded her as a member of the Chinese Imperial Family, he succeeded in bringing him into Manchuria within the deadline.

In early 1932, Doihara was sent to head the Harbin Special Agency of the Kwantung Army, where he began negotiations with General Ma Zhanshan after he had been driven from Tsitsihar by the Japanese. Ma's position was ambiguous; he continued negotiations while he supported Harbin-based General Ting Chao. When Doihara realized his negotiations were not going anywhere, he requested that Manchurian warlord Xi Qia advance with his forces to take Harbin from General Ting Chao. However, General Ting Chao was able to defeat Xi Qia's forces, and Doihara realized he would need Japanese forces to succeed. Doihara engineered a riot in Harbin to justify their intervention. That resulted in the IJA 12th Division under General Jirō Tamon coming from Mukden by rail and then marching through the snow to reinforce the attack. Harbin fell on 5 February 1932. By the end of February, General Ting Chao retreated into northeastern Manchuria and offered to cease hostilities, ending Chinese formal resistance. Within a month, the puppet state of Manchukuo was established under Doihara's supervision who had named himself mayor of Mukden. He then arranged for the puppet government to ask Tokyo to supply "military advice". During the next months 150,000 soldiers, 18,000 gendarmes and 4,000 secret police came into the newly founded protectorate. He used them as an occupying army, imposing slave labour and spreading terror to force the 30 million Chinese inhabitants into abject submission.

Ma's fame as an uncompromising fighter against the Japanese invaders survived after his defeat and so Doihara made contact with him offering a huge sum of money and the command of the puppet state's army if he would defect to the new Manchurian government. Ma pretended that he agreed and flew to Mukden in January 1932, where he attended the meeting on which the state of Manchukuo was founded and was appointed War Minister of Manchukuo and Governor of Heilongjiang Province. Then, after using the Japanese funds to raise and re-equip a new volunteer force, on 1 April 1932, he led his troops to Tsitsihar, re-establishing the Heilongjiang Provincial Government as part of the Republic of China and resumed the fight against the Japanese.

From 1932 to 1933, the newly promoted Major General Doihara commanded IJA 9th Infantry Brigade of IJA 5th Division. After the seizure of Jehol in Operation Nekka, Doihara was sent back to Manchukuo to head Houten Special Agency once again until 1934. He was then attached to IJA 12th Division until 1936.

For the key role he played in the Japanese invasion of Manchuria, he earned the nickname "Lawrence of Manchuria," a reference to Lawrence of Arabia. However, according to Jamie Bisher, the flattering sobriquet was rather misapplied, as that Colonel T.E. Lawrence had fought to liberate, not to oppress people.

Second Sino-Japanese War and Second World War                                                

From 1936 to 1937, Doihara was the commander of the 1st Depot Division in Japan until the Marco Polo Bridge Incident, when he was given command of the IJA 14th Division under the Japanese First Army in North China. There, he served in the Beiping–Hankou Railway Operation and spearheaded the campaign of Northern and Eastern Henan, where his division opposed the Chinese counterattack in the Battle of Lanfeng.

After the Battle of Lanfeng, Doihara was attached to the Army General Staff as head of the Doihara Special Agency until 1939, when he was given command of the Japanese Fifth Army, in Manchukuo under the overall control of the Kwantung Army.

In 1940, Doihara became a member of the Supreme War Council which shifted its military policy in China that year to what was called the Three Alls ("Kill all – Burn all – Loot all"). He then became head of the Army Aeronautical Department of the Ministry of War, and Inspector-General of Army Aviation until 1943. From 1940 to 1941, he was appointed Commandant of the Imperial Japanese Army Academy. On 4 November 1941, as a general in the Japanese Army Air Force and a member of the Supreme War Council he voted his approval of the attack on Pearl Harbor.

In 1943, Doihara was made Commander in Chief of the Eastern District Army. In 1944, he was appointed the Governor of Johor State, Malaya, and commander in chief of the Japanese Seventh Area Army in Singapore until 1945.

Returning to Japan in 1945, Doihara was promoted to Inspector-General of Military Training (one of the most prestigious positions in the Army) and commander in chief of the Japanese Twelfth Area Army. At the time of the surrender of Japan in 1945, Doihara was commander in chief of the 1st General Army.

Criminal activities 
Doihara's activity in China vastly exceeded the normal behaviour of an intelligence officer. As chief of the Japanese secret services in China, he worked out, put in motion, and oversaw a wide series of activities, systematically exploiting the occupied areas and disrupting Chinese social structure in the rest of the country to weaken public resistance by using every possible kind of action, including deliberately fueling criminality; fostering drug addiction; sponsoring terrorism, assassinations, blackmail, bribery, opium trafficking, and racketeering; and spreading every kind of corruption in the almost-ungovernable country. The extent of his activities and covert operations is still inadequately understood. According to Ronald Sydney Seth, his activity played a key role in shattering China's ability to confront Japan's expansion by generating chaotic conditions, which prevented any mass reaction in the invaded country.

After the occupation of Manchuria, the Japanese secret service, under his supervision, soon turned Manchukuo into a vast criminal enterprise in which rape, child molestation, sexual humiliation, sadism, assault, and murder became institutionalized means of terrorizing and controlling Manchuria's Chinese and Russian populations. Robbery by soldiers and gendarmes of the Kenpetai, arbitrary confiscation of property, and unabashed extortion became common. Underground brothels, opium dens, gambling houses, and narcotics shops run by Japanese gendarmes competed with the state monopoly syndicate of opium. Many conscientious Japanese officers protested the conditions, but Tokyo ignored them and so they were silenced. The ritual suicide of Gensui Baron Mutō Nobuyoshi, who allegedly had left a note to the emperor, Hirohito, pleading for mercy for the people of Manchuria, was in vain.

Doihara soon expanded his activity into the still unoccupied parts of China. By using about 80,000 paid Chinese villains known as Chiang Mao Tao, he funded hundreds of criminal groups, using them for every kind of social disturbance, turnover, assassinations and sabotage inside unoccupied China. Through the organizations, he soon managed to control a large part of the opium traffic in China, using the money earned to fund his covert operations.

He hired an army of agents and sent them throughout China as representatives of various humanitarian organizations. They established thousands of health centers, mainly in the villages of the districts, for curing tuberculosis, which was then epidemic in China. By adulterating medicines with opium, he managed to addict millions of unsuspecting patients, expanding societal degeneration into areas which had been hitherto untouched by the increasing breakdown of Chinese society. The scheme also created a pool of addicted victims desperate to offer any kind of service to secure a daily dose of opium.

He initially gave food and shelter to tens of thousands Russian White émigré women who had taken refuge in the Far East after the defeat of the White Russian anti-Bolshevik movement during the Russian Civil War and the withdrawal of the Entente and Japanese armies from Siberia. Having lost their livelihoods, and with most of them widowed, Doihara forced the women into prostitution, using them to create a network of brothels throughout China where they worked under inhuman conditions. The use of heroin and opium was promoted to them as a way to tolerate their miserable fate. Once addicted, the women were used to further spread the use of opium among the population by earning one free opium pipe for every six they were selling to their customers.

Winning the necessary support from the authorities in Tokyo he persuaded the Japanese tobacco industry Mitsui of Mitsui Zaibatsu to produce special cigarettes bearing the popular to the Far East trademark "Golden Bat". Their circulation was prohibited in Japan, as they were intended only for export. Doihara's services controlled their distribution in China and Manchuria where the full production was exported. In the mouthpiece of each cigarette a small dose of opium or heroin was concealed, and by this subterfuge millions of unsuspecting consumers were added to the ever-growing crowds of drug addicts in the crippled country, simultaneously creating huge profits. According to testimony presented at the Tokyo War Crimes trials in 1948, the revenue from the narcotization policy in China, including Manchukuo, was estimated as twenty to thirty million yen per year, while another authority  stated during the trial that the annual revenue was estimated by the Japanese military at 300 million dollars a year.

Given the chaotic situation in China, the corruption Doihara methodically spread did not take long to reach the very top. In 1938, Chiang had eight generals, all in command of Chinese divisions, executed when it was found that they were informers for Doihara's services. This heralded a wave of executions of high-ranking Chinese officials found guilty for every kind of dealing with Doihara during the next six years of the war. To many Westerners in touch with the Chinese leadership, the purges did not have lasting results.

Prosecution and conviction

After the surrender of Japan, he was arrested by the Allied occupation authorities and tried before the International Military Tribunal of the Far East as a Class A war criminal together with other members of the Manchurian administration responsible for the Japanese policies there. He was found guilty on counts 1, 27, 29, 31, 32, 35, 36, and 54 and was sentenced to death, while his close colleague Naoki Hoshino, financial expert and director of the Japanese State Opium Monopoly Bureau in Manchuria, was sentenced to life imprisonment. According to the indictment, as tools of successive Japanese governments they: "... pursued a systematic policy of weakening the native inhabitants' will to resist ... by directly and indirectly encouraging the increased production and importation of opium and other narcotics and by promoting the sale and consumption of such drugs among such people." He was hanged on 23 December 1948 at Sugamo Prison.

See also
 Japanese war crimes

References

Books

External links
 
 
 

Imperial Japanese Army generals of World War II
Imperial Japanese Army personnel of World War II
Japanese generals
Japanese people convicted of the international crime of aggression
Japanese people convicted of crimes against humanity
People executed by the International Military Tribunal for the Far East
Executed military leaders
1883 births
1948 deaths
Generals of Manchukuo
People from Okayama
History of Manchuria
People executed for crimes against humanity